Edward Sarpong is a Ghanaian football player who plays for Farense on loan from Portimonense.

Club career
He made his professional debut in the Segunda Liga for Portimonense on 6 August 2016 in a game against Sporting B.

FC Džiugas
In December 2021 he signed with Lithuanian FC Džiugas.

References

1997 births
Footballers from Accra
Living people
Ghanaian footballers
Ghanaian expatriate footballers
Expatriate footballers in Spain
Portimonense S.C. players
Expatriate footballers in Portugal
Liga Portugal 2 players
S.C. Farense players
Association football defenders